This is an alphabetical list of the songs known to have been written or co-written by Lisa (Japanese musician, born 1974), known as a member of M-Flo.

References 

Lisa